Chetone meta is a moth of the family Erebidae. It was described by Herbert Druce in 1895. It is found in Colombia.

References

Chetone
Moths described in 1895